Munabao railway station is located in Barmer district in the Indian state of Rajasthan. It is a railway transit point on the India–Pakistan border.

The railway station

History

A -wide metre-gauge line from Luni to Shadipalli, in Sind, was built across the Thar Desert in 1902 and the line from Shadipalli to Hyderabad (now in Pakistan) was regauged.
The Luni–Barmer–Munabao section was converted to  broad gauge in 2004.

During the 1965 war, the railway station came under the control of Pakistan.

According to a 1929 issue of the Railway Gazette, the Sind Mail used to run on this route between Ahmedabad and Hyderabad, Sindh. The route was in use with through services between Jodhpur and Karachi till around 1965. On the Pakistan side, Khokhrapar was the terminus of a metre-gauge branch line from Hyderabad, Sindh via Mirpur Khas, 135 km from the border.

The rail link across Munabao–Khokhrapar border was restored in 2006. As per the agreement between Indian and Pakistan railways, the Thar Express travels once a week from Karachi during a six-month block, crosses the international border, and the passengers change over to an Indian train at Munabao for their onward journey to Bhagat Ki Kothi in Jodhpur.

Pakistan Railways have set up a new railway station at  There is a passenger train linking Munabao to Barmer, which runs on all days except Monday.

Trains 

Some of the trains that runs from Munabao are:

 Barmer–Munabao Passenger
 Thar Express

See also

References

External links 

 website

Railway stations in Barmer district
Jodhpur railway division
Railway stations opened in 1902